The Cavern (originally released as WIthIN) is a 2005 horror film directed by Olatunde Osunsanmi.

Plot
The film is set in the Kyzylkum Desert, Kazakhstan. The opening scenes of the movie sets up the various alliances and tensions between a group of cavers. Five of them - Bailey, Gannon, Domingo, Miranda, and Ori - are part of a team who have caved together for a number of years, making their living from exploring and photographing new caves and reporting back to the world what they find there. Also involved in this trip are two Kazakh natives, Vlad and Slava, who the band have hired as guides, and Ambrose, who is researching for a book on caving.

It can also be said that there is a ghost with the group - that of Rachel, a member of the team who died on an expedition in Peru two years prior, and whose story is told in flashback as the movie goes on. The men are killed one by one by a mysterious creature, and just as the two women find the escape route, they are captured. They awaken in the beast's lair naked and wrapped in animal skin blankets where they find photos, belongings and an airplane wing in the surrounding area. After searching further, the two find water, then food, and, while eating, discover that the meat is one of their dead friends. The beast enters, and we discover he was the only survivor of a plane crash, a Russian boy called Peter. He proceeds to brutally kill one and rape the other.

Cast
 Sybil Temtchine as Bailey
 Mustafa Shakir as Gannon
 Ogy Durham as Miranda
 Andrew Caple-Shaw as Ori
 Danny A. Jacobs as Ambrose
 Andres Saenz-Hudson as Domingo
 Johnnie Colter as Human
 Neno Pervan as Slava
 Kamen Gabriel as Vlad
 Cassandra Duarden as Rachel
True Tamplin as Young Petr

Reception
Allmovie gave the film a mostly negative review, calling it, "a dime-store copycat cave-horror flick that would be entirely forgettable if not for its shocking finale."

References

External links
  
 
 

2005 horror films
2005 films
American monster movies
2000s monster movies
Films about cannibalism
American independent films
Films set in deserts
Films set in Kazakhstan
Films shot in California
Films shot in Los Angeles
Films directed by Olatunde Osunsanmi
2000s English-language films
2000s American films